The State of Israel had a population of approximately 9,506,100 inhabitants as of May 2022. Some 73.9% were Jews of all backgrounds (about 7,021,000 individuals), 21.1% were Arab of any religion other than Jewish (about 2,007,000 individuals), while the remaining 5% (about 478,000 individuals) were defined as "others", including people of Jewish ancestry deemed non-Jewish by religious law and persons of non-Jewish ancestry who are family members of Jewish immigrants (neither of which are registered at the Ministry of Interior as Jews), Christian non-Arabs, Muslim non-Arabs and all other residents who have neither an ethnic nor religious classification.

Israel's annual population growth rate stood at 2.0% in 2015, more than three times faster than the OECD average of around 0.6%. With an average of three children per woman, Israel also has the highest fertility rate in the OECD by a considerable margin and much higher than the OECD average of 1.7.
The country's demographics are monitored by the Israel Central Bureau of Statistics.

Definition 
The territory of Israel can be defined in a number of ways as a result of a complex and unresolved political situation (see table below). For example, whilst the Israel Central Bureau of Statistics defines the area of Israel to include the annexed East Jerusalem and Golan Heights, and to exclude the militarily controlled regions of the West Bank, the CBS defines the population of Israel to also include Israeli settlers living in the Area C of West Bank and the Muslim residents of East Jerusalem and Area C, who have Israeli residency or citizenship.

Population

Total population 

Note: includes over 200,000 Israelis and 250,000 Arabs in East Jerusalem, about 421,400 Jewish settlers on the West Bank, and about 42,000 in the Golan Heights (July 2007 estimate). Does not include Arab populations in the West Bank and Gaza Strip. Does not include 222,000 foreigners living in the country.

Density 

Geographic deployment, as of 2018:
 Central District: 24.5% (2,196,100)
 Tel Aviv District: 15.9% (1,427,200)
 Northern District: 16.2% (1,448,100)
 Southern District: 14.5% (1,302,000)
 Haifa District: 11.5% (1,032,800)
 Jerusalem District: 12.6% (1,133,700)
 Judea and Samaria Area (Israelis only): 4.8% (427,800)

Population growth rate 
 2.0% (2016)

During the 1990s, the Jewish population growth rate was about 3% per year, as a result of massive immigration to Israel, primarily from the republics of the former Soviet Union. There is also a very high population growth rate among certain Jewish groups, especially adherents of Orthodox Judaism. The growth rate of the Arab population in Israel is 2.2%, while the growth rate of the Jewish population in Israel is 1.8%. The growth rate of the Arab population has slowed from 3.8% in 1999 to 2.2% in 2013, and for the Jewish population, the growth rate declined from 2.7% to its lowest rate of 1.4% in 2005. Due to a rise in fertility of the Jewish population since 1995 and immigration, the growth rate has since risen to 1.8%.

Fertility 
The total fertility rate (TFR) of a population is the average number of children that an average woman would have, in her lifetime.

 3.01 children born/woman (2019)
Jewish total fertility rate increased by 10.2% during 1998–2009, and was recorded at 2.90 during 2009. During the same time period, Arab TFR decreased by 20.5%. Muslim TFR was measured at 3.73 for 2009. During 2000, the Arab TFR in Jerusalem (4.43) was higher than that of the Jews residing there (3.79). But as of 2009, Jewish TFR in Jerusalem was measured higher than the Arab TFR (2010: 4.26 vs 3.85, 2009: 4.16 vs 3.87). TFR for Arab residents in the West Bank was measured at 2.91 in 2013, while that for the Jewish residents was reported at 5.10 children per woman.

The ethnic group with highest recorded TFR is the Bedouin of Negev. Their TFR was reported at 10.06 in 1998, and 5.73 in 2009. TFR is also very high among Haredi Jews. For Ashkenazi Haredim, the TFR rose from 6.91 in 1980 to 8.51 in 1996. The figure for 2008 is estimated to be even higher. TFR for Sephardi/Mizrahi Haredim rose from 4.57 in 1980 to 6.57 in 1996. In 2020 the overall Jewish TFR in Israel (3.00) was for the first time measured higher than Arab Muslim TFR (2.99).

Birth rate 

2021 :

 Total: 19.7 births/1,000 population
 Jews and others: 19.1 births/1,000 population
 Muslims: 23.4 births/1,000 population
 Christians: 13.3 births/1,000 population
 Druze: 15.8 births/1,000 population

  Births by mother's religion January – February 2021: Jewish 21,199 (75.18%) ; Muslim 5,629 (19.96%); Christian 328 (1.16%); Druze 320 (1.13%); others 719 (2.55%) ; Total 28,198
  Births by mother's religion January – February 2022: Jewish 21,079 (75.09%); Muslim 5,675 (20.22%); Christian 338 (1.20%); Druze 346 (1.23%); others 635 (2.26%); Total 28,073

Births, in absolute numbers, by mother's religion

Between the mid-1980s and 2000, the fertility rate in the Muslim sector was stable at 4.6–4.7 children per woman; after 2001, a gradual decline became evident, reaching 3.51 children per woman in 2011. By point of comparison, in 2011, there was a rising fertility rate of 2.98 children among the Jewish population.

Life expectancy 

As of 2019:
 Total population: 82.8 years
 Male: 81 years
 Female: 84.7 years

Infant mortality rate 
 Total: 4.03 deaths/1,000 live births
 Male: 4.20 deaths/1,000 live births
 Female: 3.84 deaths/1,000 live births (2013 est.)

Age structure 

Total:
 0–14 years: 28.0%
 15–64 years: 62.1%
 65 years and over: 9.9%

Jews:
 0–14 years: 25.5%
 15–64 years: 63.1%
 65 years and over: 11.4%

Arab:
 0–14 years: 37.5%
 15–64 years: 58.6%
 65 years and over: 3.9% (2010 est.)

Median age 
 Total: 29.7
 Jewish: 31.6
 Arab: 21.1

The Jewish median age in Jerusalem district and the West Bank are 24.9 and 19.7, respectively, and both account for 16% of the Jewish population, but 24% of 0- to 4-year-olds. The lowest median age in Israel, and one of the lowest in the world, is found in two of the West Bank's biggest Jewish cities: Modi'in Illit (11), Beitar Illit (11) followed by Bedouin towns in the Negev (15.2).

Cities 

Within Israel's system of local government, an urban municipality can be granted a city council by the Israeli Interior Ministry when its population exceeds 20,000. The term "city" does not generally refer to local councils or urban agglomerations, even though a defined city often contains only a small portion of an urban area or metropolitan area's population.

Ethnic and religious groups

Statistics 

The most prominent ethnic and religious groups that live in Israel at present and that are Israeli citizens or nationals are as follows:

Jews 

According to Israel's Central Bureau of Statistics, in 2008, of Israel's 7.3 million people, 75.6 percent were Jews of any background. Among them, 70.3 percent were Sabras (born in Israel), mostly second- or third-generation Israelis, and the rest are olim (Jewish immigrants to Israel)—20.5 percent from Europe and the Americas, and 9.2 percent from Asia and Africa, including the Arab countries. About 44.9% percent of Israel's Jewish population identify as either Mizrahi or Sephardi, 44.2% identify as Ashkenazi, about 3% as Beta Israel and 7.9% as mixed or other.

The paternal lineage of the Jewish population of Israel as of 2015 is as follows:

Arabs 

Arab citizens of Israel are those Arab residents of Mandatory Palestine that remained within Israel's borders following the 1948 Arab–Israeli War and the establishment of the State of Israel. It is including those born within the state borders subsequent to this time, as well as those who had left during the establishment of the state (or their descendants), who have since re-entered by means accepted as lawful residence by the Israeli state (primarily family reunifications).

In 2019, the official number of Arab residents in Israel was 1,890,000 people, representing 21% of Israel's population. This figure includes 209,000 Arabs (14% of the Israeli Arab population) in East Jerusalem, also counted in the Palestinian statistics, although 98 percent of East Jerusalem Palestinians have either Israeli residency or Israeli citizenship.

Arab Muslims

Most Arab citizens of Israel are Muslim, particularly of the Sunni branch of Islam. A small minority are Ahmadiyya sect and there are also some Alawites (affiliated with Shia Islam) in the northernmost village of Ghajar with Israeli citizenship. As of 2019, Arab citizens of Israel composed 21 percent of the country's total population. About 82 percent of the Arab population in Israel are Sunni Muslims, a very small minority are Shia Muslims, another 9 percent are Druze, and around 9 percent are Christian (mostly Eastern Orthodox and Catholic denominations).

Bedouin
The Arab Muslim citizens of Israel include also the Bedouins, who are divided into two main groups: the Bedouin in the north of Israel, who live in villages and towns for the most part, and the Bedouin in the Negev, who include half-nomadic and inhabitants of towns and Unrecognized villages. According to the Israeli Ministry of Foreign Affairs, as of 1999, 110,000 Bedouins live in the Negev, 50,000 in the Galilee and 10,000 in the central region of Israel. The vast majority of Arab Bedouins of Israel practice Sunni Islam.

Ahmadiyya

The Ahmadiyya community was first established in the region in the 1920s, in what was then Mandatory Palestine. There is a large community in Kababir, a neighborhood on Mount Carmel in Haifa. It is unknown how many Israeli Ahmadis there are, although it is estimated there are about 2,200 Ahmadis in Kababir alone.

Arab Christians

As of December 2013, about 161,000 Israeli citizens practiced Christianity, together comprising about 2% of the total population. The largest group consists of Melkites (about 60% of Israel's Christians), followed by the Greek Orthodox (about 30%), with the remaining ca. 10% spread between the Roman Catholic (Latin), Maronite, Anglican, Lutheran, Armenian, Syriac, Ethiopian, Coptic and other denominations.

Druze
The Arab citizens of Israel include also the Druze, who numbered at an estimated 143,000 in April 2019. All of the Druze living in what was then British Mandate Palestine became Israeli citizens after the declaration of the State of Israel. Druze serve prominently in the Israel Defense Forces, and are represented in mainstream Israeli politics and business as well, unlike Muslim or Christian Arabs who are not required to and generally choose not to serve in the Israeli army. Though a few individuals identify themselves as "Palestinian Druze", the vast majority of Druze do not consider themselves to be 'Palestinian', and consider their Israeli identity stronger than their Arab identity. A 2017 Pew Research Center poll reported that the majority of the Israeli Druze identified as ethnically Arab.

Syriac Christians 
Arameans
In 2014, Israel decided to recognize the Aramaic community within its borders as a national minority, allowing some of the Christians in Israel to be registered as "Aramean" instead of "Arab". As of October 2014, some 600 Israelis requested to be registered as Arameans, with several thousand eligible for the status – mostly members of the Maronite community.

The Maronite Christian community in Israel of around 7,000 resides mostly in the Galilee, with a presence in Haifa, Nazareth and Jerusalem. It is largely composed of families that lived in Upper Galilee in villages such as Jish long before the establishment of Israel in 1948. In the year 2000, the community was joined by a group of Lebanese SLA militia members and their families, who fled Lebanon after 2000 withdrawal of IDF from South Lebanon.

Assyrians
There are around 1,000 Assyrians living in Israel, mostly in Jerusalem and Nazareth. Assyrians are an Aramaic speaking, Eastern Rite Christian minority who are descended from the ancient Mesopotamians. The old Syriac Orthodox monastery of Saint Mark lies in Jerusalem. Other than followers of the Syriac Orthodox Church, there are also followers of the Assyrian Church of the East and the Chaldean Catholic Church living in Israel.

Other citizens 
Copts

Some 1,000 Israeli citizens belong to the Coptic community, originating in Egypt.

Samaritans
The Samaritans are an ethnoreligious group of the Levant. Ancestrally, they claim descent from a group of Israelite inhabitants who have connections to ancient Samaria from the beginning of the Babylonian Exile up to the beginning of the Common Era. 2007 population estimates show that 712 Samaritans live half in Holon, Israel and half at Mount Gerizim in the West Bank. The Holon community holds Israeli citizenship, while the Gerizim community resides at an Israeli-controlled enclave, holding dual Israeli-Palestinian citizenship.

Armenians
About 4,000 Armenians reside in Israel mostly in Jerusalem (including in the Armenian Quarter), but also in Tel Aviv, Haifa and Jaffa. Armenians have a Patriarchate in Jerusalem and churches in Jerusalem, Haifa and Jaffa. Although Armenians of Old Jerusalem have Israeli identity cards, they are officially holders of Jordanian passports.

Circassians

In Israel, there are also a few thousand Circassians, living mostly in Kfar Kama (2,000) and Reyhaniye (1,000). These two villages were a part of a greater group of Circassian villages around the Golan Heights. The Circassians in Israel enjoy, like Druzes, a status aparte. Male Circassians (at their leader's request) are mandated for military service, while females are not.

People from post-Soviet states
Ethnic Russians, Ukrainians, and Belarusians, immigrants from the former Soviet Union, who were eligible to emigrate due to having, or being married to somebody who has, at least one Jewish grandparent and thus qualified for Israeli citizenship under the revised Law of Return. A number of these immigrants also belong to various ethnic groups from the Former Soviet Union such as Armenians, Georgians, Azeris, Uzbeks, Moldovans, Tatars, among others. Some of them, having a Jewish father or grandfather, identify as Jews, but being non-Jewish by Orthodox Halakha (religious law), they are not recognized formally as Jews by the state. Most of them are in the mainstream of Israel culture and are called "expanded Jewish population". In addition, a certain number of former Soviet citizens, primarily women of Russian and Ukrainian ethnicity, emigrated to Israel, after marrying Muslim or Christian Arab citizens of Israel, who went to study in the former Soviet Union in the 1970s and 1980s. 1,557,698 people from the current Russia and Ukraine live in Israel.

Finns

Although most people of Finnish origin in Israel are Finnish Jews who immigrated to Israel, and their descendants, a small number of Finnish Christians moved to Israel in the 1940s before independence and gained citizenship following independence. For the most part, many of the original Finnish settlers intermarried with the other communities in the country, and therefore remain very small in number. A Moshav shitufi near Jerusalem named Yad HaShmona, meaning the "Memorial for the Eight", was established in 1971 by a group of Finnish Christian-Israelis, although today, most members are Israeli, and are predominantly Hebrew speakers, and the moshav has become a center of Messianic Jews.

Baháʼís

The population of followers of the Baháʼí Faith in Israel is almost entirely made up of volunteers serving at the Baháʼí World Centre. Bahá'u'lláh (1817–1892), the Faith's founder, was banished to Akka and died nearby where his shrine is located. During his lifetime he instructed his followers not to teach or convert those living in the area, and the Baháʼís descending from those original immigrants were later asked to leave and teach elsewhere. For nearly a century there has been a policy by Baháʼí leaders to not accept converts living in Israel. The 650 or so foreign national Baháʼís living in Israel are almost all on temporary duty serving at the shrines and administrative offices.

Vietnamese

The number of Vietnamese people in Israel and their descendants is estimated at 150 to 200. Most of them came to Israel in between 1976 and 1979, after prime minister Menachem Begin authorized their admission to Israel and granted them political asylum. The Vietnamese people living in Israel are Israeli citizens who also serve in the Israel Defense Forces. Today, the majority of the community lives in the Gush Dan area in the center of Tel Aviv, but also a few dozen Vietnamese-Israelis or Israelis of Vietnamese origin live in Haifa, Jerusalem, and Ofakim.

African Hebrew Israelites of Jerusalem
The African Hebrew Israelite Nation of Jerusalem is a religious sect of Black Americans, founded in 1960 by Ben Carter a metal worker in Chicago. The members of this sect believe they are descended from the tribes of Judah driven from the Holy Land by the Romans during the First Jewish War (70 AD), and who reportedly emigrated to West Africa before being taken as slaves to the United States. With a population of over 5,000, most members live in their own community in Dimona, Israel, with additional families in Arad, Mitzpe Ramon, and the Tiberias area. The group believes that the ancient Israelites are the ancestors of Black Americans and that the actual Jews are "impostors". Some scholarship does consider them to be of subsaharan African origin, rather than Levantine. Their ancestors were Black Americans who, after being expelled from Liberia, illegally immigrated to Israel in the late 1960s using tourist visas, requesting that Israel provide them legal citizenship status. Israel granted their requests. The African Hebrew Israelites, like the Haredim and most Israeli Arabs, are not required to serve in the military; however, some do.

Naturalized foreign workers

Some naturalized foreign workers and their children born in Israel, predominantly from the Philippines, Nepal, Nigeria, Senegal, Romania, China, Cyprus, Thailand, and South America (mainly Colombia).

Non-citizens 
African migrants

The number and status of African migrants in Israel is disputed and controversial, but it is estimated that at least 70,000 refugees mainly from Eritrea, Sudan, South Sudan, Ethiopia, and the Ivory Coast reside and work in Israel. A count in late 2011 published in Ynet pointed out the number only in Tel Aviv is 40,000, which represents 10 percent of the city's population. The vast majority live in the southern parts of the city. There is a significant population in the southern Israeli cities of Eilat, Arad, and Beersheba.

Foreign workers
There are around 300,000 foreign workers, residing in Israel under temporary work visas, including Palestinians. Most of those foreign workers engage in agriculture and construction. The main groups of those foreign workers include the Chinese, Thai, Filipinos, Nigerians, Romanians, and Latin Americans.

Other refugees

Approximately 100–200 refugees from Bosnia, Kosovo, Iraqi Kurdistan, and North Korea were absorbed in Israel as refugees. Most of them were also given Israeli resident status, and currently reside in Israel. As of 2006, some 200 ethnic Kurdish refugees from Turkey resided in Israel as illegal immigrants, fleeing the Kurdish–Turkish conflict.

Languages 

Due to its immigrant nature, Israel is one of the most multicultural and multilingual societies in the world. Hebrew is the official language of the country, and Arabic is given special status, while English and Russian are the two most widely spoken non-official languages. A certain degree of English is spoken widely, and is the language of choice for many Israeli businesses. Hebrew and English language are mandatory subjects in the Israeli school system, and most schools offer either Arabic, French, Spanish, German, Italian, or Russian.

Religion 

According to a 2010 Israel Central Bureau of Statistics study of Israelis aged over 18:
 8% of Israeli Jews define themselves as Haredim (or ultra-Orthodox); 
 12% are "religious" (non-Haredi Orthodox, also known as: dati leumi/national-religious or religious Zionist); 
 13% consider themselves "religious-traditionalists" (mostly adhering to Jewish Halakha); 
 25% are "non-religious traditionalists" (only partly respecting the Jewish Halakha), and 
 43% are "secular".

While the ultra-Orthodox, or Haredim, represented only 5% of Israel's population in 1990, they are expected to represent more than one-fifth of Israel's Jewish population by 2028. By 2020, they were 12% of the population.

Education 

Education between ages 5 and 15 is compulsory. It is not free, but it is subsidized by the government, individual organizations (such as the Beit Yaakov System), or a combination. Parents are expected to participate in courses as well. The school system is organized into kindergartens, 6-year primary schools, and either 6-year secondary schools or 3-year junior secondary schools + 3-year senior secondary schools (depending on region), after which a comprehensive examination is offered for university admissions.

Literacy 
Age 15 and over can read and write (2011 estimate):
 Total population: 97.8%
 Male: 98.7%
 Female: 96.8%

Policy 

Israel is the thirtieth-most-densely-crowded country in the world. In an academic article, Jewish National Fund Board member Daniel Orenstein, argues that, as elsewhere, overpopulation is a stressor on the environment in Israel; he shows that environmentalists have conspicuously failed to consider the impact of population on the environment, and argues that overpopulation in Israel has not been appropriately addressed for ideological reasons.

Citizenship and Entry Law 

The Citizenship and Entry into Israel Law (Temporary Order) 5763 was first passed on 31 July 2003, and has since been extended until 31 July 2008. The law places age restrictions for the automatic granting of Israeli citizenship and residency permits to spouses of Israeli citizens, such that spouses who are inhabitants of the West Bank and Gaza Strip are ineligible. On 8 May 2005, the Israeli ministerial committee for issues of legislation once again amended the Citizenship and Entry into Israel Law, to restrict citizenship and residence in Israel only to Palestinian men over the age of 35, and Palestinian women over the age of 25. Those in favor of the law say the law not only limits the possibility of the entrance of terrorists into Israel, but, as Ze'ev Boim asserts, allows Israel "to maintain the state's democratic nature, but also its Jewish nature" (i. e., its Jewish demographic majority). Critics, including the United Nations Committee on the Elimination of Racial Discrimination, say the law disproportionately affects Arab citizens of Israel, since Arabs in Israel are far more likely to have spouses from the West Bank and Gaza Strip than other Israeli citizens.

In the constitutional challenges to the Citizenship and Entry to Israel Law, the state, represented by the Attorney General, insisted that security was the only objective behind the law. The state also added that even if the law was intended to achieve demographic objectives, it is still in conformity with Israel's Jewish and democratic definition, and thus constitutional. In a 2012 ruling by the Supreme Court on the issue, some of the judges on the panel discussed demography, and were inclined to accept that demography is a legitimate consideration in devising family reunification policies that violate the right to family life.

Vital statistics

Current vital statistics

Immigration

Net migration rate 
 1.81 migrant(s)/1,000 population (2013 est.)

There were a total of 28,629 immigrants who made Aliyah to Israel in 2019 (jan-oct):

12,722 from Russia; 5,247 from Ukraine; 2,470 from the United States; 276 from Canada; 143 from Australia; 1,996 from France; 469 from the UK; 350 from Brazil; 321 from South Africa; 93 from Venezuela; 127 from Mexico; 143 from Turkey; 57 from Iran; 14 from Thailand and 5 from Japan.

Immigration/Aliyah 
Immigrants by last country of residence in recent years (according to CBS and the Jewish Agency):

Soviet immigration 

During the 1970s about 163,000 people of Jewish descent immigrated to Israel from the USSR.

Later Ariel Sharon, in his capacity as Minister of Housing & Construction and member of the Ministerial Committee for Immigration & Absorption, launched an unprecedented large-scale construction effort to accommodate the new Russian population in Israel so as to facilitate their smooth integration and encourage further Jewish immigration as an ongoing means of increasing the Jewish population of Israel. Between 1989 and 2006, about 979,000 Jews emigrated from the former Soviet Union to Israel.

Emigration 
For many years definitive data on Israeli emigration was unavailable. In The Israeli Diaspora sociologist Stephen J. Gold maintains that calculation of Jewish emigration has been a contentious issue, explaining, "Since Zionism, the philosophy that underlies the existence of the Jewish state, calls for return home of the world's Jews, the opposite movement—Israelis leaving the Jewish state to reside elsewhere—clearly presents an ideological and demographic problem."

In the past several decades, emigration (yerida) has seen a considerable increase. From 1990 to 2005, 230,000 Israelis left the country; a large proportion of these departures included people who initially immigrated to Israel and then reversed their course (48% of all post-1990 departures and even 60% of 2003 and 2004 departures were former immigrants to Israel). 8% of Jewish immigrants in the post-1990 period left Israel, while 15% of non-Jewish immigrants did. In 2005 alone, 21,500 Israelis left the country and had not yet returned at the end of 2006; among them 73% were Jews, 5% Arabs, and 22% "Others" (mostly non-Jewish immigrants, with Jewish ancestry, from USSR). At the same time, 10,500 Israelis came back to Israel after over one year abroad; 84% were Jews, 9% Others, and 7% Arabs.

According to the Israel Central Bureau of Statistics, as of 2005, 650,000 Israelis had left the country for over one year and not returned. Of them, 530,000 are still alive today. This number does not include the children born overseas. It should also be noted that Israeli law grants citizenship only to the first generation of children born to Israeli emigrants.

Health

HIV/AIDS – adult prevalence rate 
 0.2% (2009 est.)

Obesity – adult prevalence rate 
 26% of women and 40% of men are overweight. In both genders, obesity rate is 15% (as of 2011).

Future projections 
In June 2013, the Central Bureau of Statistics released a demographic report, projecting that Israel's population would grow to 11.4 million by 2035, with the Jewish population numbering 8.3 million, or 73% of the population, and the Arab population at 2.6 million, or 23%. This includes some 2.3 million Muslims (20% of the population), 185,000 Druze, and 152,000 Christians. The report predicts that the Israeli population growth rate will decline to 1.4% annually, with growth in the Muslim population remaining higher than the Jewish population until 2035, at which point the Jewish population will begin growing the fastest.

In 2017, the Central Bureau of Statistics projected that Israel's population would rise to about 18 million by 2059, including 14.4 million Jews and 3.6 million Arabs. Of the Jewish population, about 5.25 million would be ultra-Orthodox Jews. Overall, the forecast projected that 49% of the population would be either ultra-Orthodox Jews (29%) or Arabs (20%). It also projected a population of 20 million in 2065. Jews and other non-Arabs are expected to compose 81% of the population in 2065, and Arabs 19%. About 32% of the population is expected to be Haredi.

Other forecasts project that Israel could have a population as high as 23 million, or even 36 million, by 2050.

See also 

 Aliyah
 Crime in Israel
 Culture of Israel
 Demographic history of Palestine (region)
 Demographics of the Middle East
 Demographics of the State of Palestine
 Health care in Israel
 Israel Central Bureau of Statistics
 Jewish population by country
 Standard of living in Israel
 Women in Israel

References

Further reading 

 
 
 Book review by John Waterbury.
Videos of academic lectures posted on the official YouTube VOD (video on demand) channel of Tel Aviv University:
 (28 min)
 (16 min)
  (31 min)

External links 
 Official website of the Israel Central Bureau of Statistics
 Population of Israel by the Tourism Ministry
 Israel. The World Factbook. Central Intelligence Agency.
 Issues in Israeli Society at the Jewish Agency for Israel